Andraca nobilorum is a moth of the family Endromidae. It is found in central Vietnam and south-eastern China (Guangxi).

The wingspan is 38–39 mm. The forewings are sandy yellow, with a wing pattern of lunate, transverse, black (with a dark grey apical spot) prominent submarginal spots and a large basal spot. The external area is darkened. The discal dot is small and dark grey and there is fine bluish suffusion around the dark pattern elements. The costal area of the hindwings is paler. Adults have been recorded on wing in April and June.

Subspecies
Andraca nobilorum nobilorum (Vietnam)
Andraca nobilorum houtuae Wang & Zolotuhin, 2012 (China: Guangxi)

References

Moths described in 2012
Andraca